The Belgium national beach soccer team represents Belgium in international beach soccer competitions and is controlled by the KBVB, the governing body for football in Belgium.

Current squad
Correct as of February 2011

Coach: Yves Soudan

Current Staff
 Assistant Manager: Philippe Vande Walle

Achievements
 FIFA Beach Soccer World Cup Best: Twelfth place
 2004
 FIFA Beach Soccer World Cup qualification (UEFA) Best: Round of 16
 2009

External links
 Squad

European national beach soccer teams
Beach Soccer